"This Means War" is a song by American heavy metal band Avenged Sevenfold from the album Hail to the King.

Various publications have lambasted the track for its uncanny similarities to Metallica's 1992 single "Sad but True". The song was singled out by Machine Head's vocalist Robb Flynn as a ripoff. Users on Ultimate Guitar voted the song into the site's "Worst Guitar Riffs" list.

Although the song was not released as a single, the song placed on several American Billboard rock charts, and received a music video. Directed by Andrew Baird, it was released July 5, 2014.  The song was featured in the video game WWE 2K15.

Personnel
Avenged Sevenfold
 M. Shadows – lead vocals
 Zacky Vengeance – rhythm guitar, backing vocals
 Synyster Gates – lead guitar, backing vocals
 Johnny Christ – bass guitar
 Arin Ilejay – drums

Charts

Weekly charts

Year-end charts

References

External links 

Avenged Sevenfold songs
2013 songs
Song recordings produced by Mike Elizondo